The Communist Workers Party was a pro-Soviet communist party in Japan. It was founded in November 1966 and split into three factions in December 1971. The party published the newspaper Toitsu between February 1967 and December 1971.

The youth wing of the party was the Proletarian Youth League and its student branch was the Proletarian Student League.

References 

Communist parties in Japan
Defunct political parties in Japan
Political parties established in 1966
Political parties disestablished in 1986
1966 establishments in Japan
1986 disestablishments in Japan
Defunct communist parties